Robert Megna (born December 10, 1958) is an American politician who served in the Connecticut House of Representatives from the 97th district from 2001 to 2017.

References

1958 births
Living people
Democratic Party members of the Connecticut House of Representatives
Politicians from Hackensack, New Jersey